Budowitz are a klezmer band incorporating 19th century instruments and themes from the folk music of Bessarabia, Galicia and Bukovina, into their music.  Its members live in Hungary, Germany and the United States.  The band is named after 19th Century accordion maker Karl Budowitz, who built the accordion played by Joshua Horowitz in the group.

They have won a number of awards including BBC's Critics Circle award for best CD and the British Songlines Magazine's "Top of the World" award.

Members who have played at various times

 Christian Dawid - Clarinet
 Tamas Gombai - Violin
 Joshua Horowitz - Cimbalom (Tsimbl) and Accordion
 Walt Mahovlich - Clarinet
 Michael Winograd - Clarinet
 Steven Greenman - Violin
 Lothar Lasser - Accordion
 Geza Penzes - Cello and Bass
 Zsolt Kurtosi - Cello and Bass
 Cookie Segelstein - Violin and Viola
 Sandor Toth - 3-stringed Contra Viola
Merlin Shepherd - C and Eb clarinets

Discography

Mother Tongue (1997)
Wedding without a Bride (2000)
Budowitz Live (2007)

See also
Veretski Pass (band)

External links
 Budowitz Web Site
 June 21, 2008 Concert on the CBC
 Interview with Budowitz on the Golden Horn Records site
 Budowitz "Mother Tongue" review on KlezmerShack

Hungarian folk music groups
Klezmer groups